Parcours de réfugiés is a 2009 documentary film about refugees in Morocco, directed by Ali Benjelloun.

Synopsis 
Morocco receives many emigrants whose ultimate destination is Europe. About a thousand of these migrants hold a political refugee card from the United Nations High Commissioner for Refugees Agency (UNHCR). However, even those with this card face challenges.

Awards 
Parcours de réfugiés was screened at the following festivals:
 Festival Internacional del Cortometraje y del Documental de Casablanca 2010
 Festival Internacional de Cine Documental de Khouribga (FIFDOC) 2010

References 

2009 films
2009 documentary films
Moroccan documentary films
Documentary films about refugees
2000s French-language films